The Ten Commandments (Portuguese: Os Dez Mandamentos - O Filme) is a 2016 Brazilian film released by RecordTV in an association with Paris Filmes. It is an adaptation of the eponymous television series presented by Rede Record in 2015, with new footage and different developments of which were shown in its last chapter on television. The adaptation was written by Vivian de Oliveira and directed by Alexandre Avancini, with the same cast as the soap opera.

Earning over R$116.4 million, The Ten Commandments is currently the fourth highest-grossing Brazilian film.

Plot
The film tells the story of Moses leading the Israelite people out of Egypt into the promised land. The plot has the loose adaptation of four books of the Bible that have this trajectory: Exodus, Leviticus, Numbers and Deuteronomy. Welcomed by Pharaoh's daughter as a baby, Moses grows as an Egyptian Prince, but turns against his adoptive family in favor of the suffering people of Israel, whom he should lead to liberty.

Background
The soap opera The Ten Commandments is considered biblical teledramaturgy. In 2010, RecordTV launched the first product on television with this theme, with the debut of the 10-episode miniseries, The Story of Esther. In 2011, the 18-episode minisseries Samson and Delilah debuted. In 2012, it was the time of King David, with 30 episodes. In 2013, Joseph from Egypt debuted, with 38 episodes. In 2014, the series Miracles of Jesus debuted with 18 episodes in the first season, and in 2015 the second season premiered with 17 episodes.

The film is an adaptation of the eponymous soap opera produced by Record and broadcast from 23 March to 23 November 2015. This is the first biblical novel produced in the world. Broke records of ratings and topped the most-watched Primetime shows. After the last episodes of the first season in 2015, the network announced the film on 19 November 2015.

Reception

Box office
On 1 January 2016, Cinemark movie network started the pre-sale of tickets for the film. On 7 January, more than 401,000 tickets had been sold.

The Universal Church of the Kingdom of God released the film and asked the faithful to buy tickets and donate to others. In Recife one person bought 22,700 tickets for R$220,000, according to the website UOL. Universo Online website also reported that, despite this strategy, journalists found empty rooms at the premiere of the film in São Paulo. In a first note on its official website, UCKG vehemently denied the information, stating that "the church has never forced anyone to perform any act" and criticized the news. In another note, UCKG also denied an information about vacancies in sessions, stating that "they were not pre-sale but marketed in piecemeal fashion."

About 10.8 million tickets have been sold since the debut of the film, making The Ten Commandments the second largest audience in Brazil's cinema history. However, Folha de S.Paulo points out that the list made by Ancine mentions "public", not "sold tickets". while several sessions of the film had empty seats even with all tickets sold. After two weeks, the film grossed R$42 million.

Critical reception
The film received generally negative reviews from critics, who reproached its narrative, acting, editing and adaptation of 176 chapters into two hours. Renato Marafon, from Cinepop website gave the film one star and a half out of 5, with an emphasis on "disjointed scenes and lack of focus on the main characters" and stressed the "modern slangs" used in a production about Ancient Egypt. Renato Hermsdorff, from AdoroCinema website, also gave the film a rating of one star and a half out of 5, writing that "characters come and go at a crazy pace, preventing the viewer from understanding exactly what is happening," and described the technical point of view the film as "exaggerated and poor [...] from the scenery to the costumes, everything reminds a great parade of carnival." Folha de S.Paulo in its online version written by Inácio Araújo, criticized the narrative, script, casting and editing of the film, but praised the action scenes, "in particular the special effects" but also criticized the use of slow motion in them. Giovanni Rizzo, from Observatório do Cinema, gave the film 1 star out of 5, saying that "the sound mixing is poorly crafted and sometimes the audio bursts and it's impossible to understand what a character says." Roberto Sadovski, writing a review on his blog in UOL, has heavily criticized the film, as the lack of context in important scenes as the relationship between Moses and Pharaoh, and the "visual poverty and inadequate cast and scenarios."

UCKG promotion
The UCKG was criticised for heavily promoting the film at their services, and asking those attending for money to buy tickets for those who could not afford them; pastors at church services distributed envelopes with the Ten Commandments logo, and asked for them to be filled with money and returned to help the "cause", interspersed with stressing the importance of tithing 10% of salary, plus extra donations, every month.

Cast

References

External links

Brazilian drama films
Films based on television series
Cultural depictions of Nefertari
Films based on the Book of Exodus